Nnorom Azuonye  (born 12 July 1967, in Biafra) is a publisher, theater director, playwright, poet and advertising professional. He is also an accredited Methodist Local Preacher with the Methodist Church in Britain and serves as Principal Networker, Global Calvary Network. He wrote Letter To God & Other Poems in 2003, The Bridge Selection: Poems for the Road (2005 & 2012) and Funeral of the Minstrel in 2015). The Founding Publishing Director & Chief Executive Officer, SPM Publications Ltd, Azuonye is the founder and administrator of Sentinel Poetry Movement and the founder and publisher of the magazines Nollywood Focus, Sentinel Literary Quarterly, Sentinel Nigeria and Sentinel Champions.

Early life and education

Nnorom Azuonye is a native of Isuikwuato, Abia State of Nigeria, but was born at Enugu, now in Enugu State of Nigeria, on 12 July 1967. He is the youngest son of Stephen Onyemaechi Azuonye MON, MBE, and Hannah Egwuime Azuonye. He attended Government College Umuahia, Capital College, London, and University of Nigeria, Nsukka, where he studied Dramatic Arts.

Literary activities

In 2002, Azuonye founded the Sentinel Poetry Movement - an international community of writers and artists providing an interaction and publishing resource for poetry, fiction, drama, essays, interviews and review of the Arts. He is the Managing Editor of Sentinel Literary Quarterly - a magazine of world literature published by Sentinel Poetry Movement. He is also the publisher of Sentinel Nigeria magazine - an online magazine of contemporary Nigerian writing Sentinel's previous two publications, Sentinel Poetry (Online) and Sentinel Poetry Quarterly, have been merged into the single publication Sentinel Literary Quarterly

Writing

Azuonye has been widely published internationally in journals, newspapers and anthologies including Agenda, DrumVoices Revue, Eclectica, Orbis, World Haiku Review, Nigerians Talk, African Writing, African Writers, Sketchbook, Poetry Monthly, Opon Ifa, Theatre Forum, Voices Against Racism: 100 Poems Against Racism, and Poems for a Liminal Age (Mandy Pannett ed.)

Books
Letter to God & Other Poems (2003), 
The Bridge Selection: Poems for the Road (2005 & 2012).
Blue Hyacinths (2010; ed. with Geoff Stevens), 
Sentinel Annual Literature Anthology (2011; ed with Unoma Azuah and Amanda Sington-Williams), 
Funeral of the Minstrel 
The Genesis of Falcon (ed.) (a play, 2015).

Family
Nnorom married Thelma Amaka Azuonye (née Mbomi) in 2006. They live in London, United Kingdom, with their children Arinzechukwu, Nwachiamanda, Obinna and Ugochukwu.

References

External links
Nnorom's blog

1967 births
Living people
Igbo poets
Nigerian male poets
People of the Nigerian Civil War
University of Nigeria alumni
21st-century Nigerian poets
Nigerian expatriates in the United Kingdom
Government College Umuahia alumni